Korba railway station serves Korba, Chhattisgarh, India.

Major trains

 Gevra Road–Raipur Passenger 
 Wainganga Superfast Express
 Thiruvananthapuram–Korba Express
 Korba–Raipur MEMU
 Gevra Road–Bilaspur Passenger
 Gevra Road–Bilaspur MEMU
 Korba–Visakhapatnam Express
 Gevra Road–Raipur MEMU
 Shivnath Express
 Hasdeo Antyodaya Express
Chhattisgarh Express
Hasdeo Express

References

External links
 The Korba City
 

Railway stations in Korba district
Bilaspur railway division
Korba, Chhattisgarh
Transport in Korba, Chhattisgarh